Elon is a town in Alamance County, North Carolina, United States. It is part of the Burlington metropolitan statistical area. The population as of the 2020 census was 11,324. The town of Elon is home to Elon University.

Elon began in 1881 as a North Carolina Railroad depot in between the stations of Goldsboro and Charlotte, called "Mill Point” because it was envisioned to be a shipping point for area cotton mills. Locals called it “Boone’s Crossing.” Because of a growing population, a post office was built, which established a more permanent residency in 1888.

In 1889, the local Christian Assembly created an institution of higher learning called the “Graham Normal College”. The founders of Elon College named the school “Elon”, because they understood that to be the Hebrew word for oak, and the area contained many oak trees. The town was called "Elon College" until the college known as Elon College became Elon University. The town then changed its name officially to Elon.

The economy of the Elon consists of a variety of locally owned small businesses, manufacturing, retirement communities, and Elon University. Downtown Elon is home to over 20 locally owned and operated businesses including Pandora's Pies, The Root Trackside, Magerks Elon, Smitty's Home Made Ice Cream, All That Jas, Simply Oak Boutique, Cynthia Huffines and Associates Interior Design, The Oak House, Skid's, Mediterranean Deli & Grocery, Coming Attractions Salon, The Wash Board, and the Acorn Inn.

Geography

Demographics

2020 census

As of the 2020 United States census, there were 11,336 people, 3,465 households, and 1,888 families residing in the town.

2010 census
As of the census of 2010, there were 9,419 people, 2,794 households, and 1,357 families residing in the town. The population density was 2,415.1 people per square mile (923.4/km2). There were 3,063 housing units at an average density of 785.4 per square mile (300.3/km2). The racial makeup of the town was 86.7% White, 8.5% African American, 0.1% Native American, 2% Asian, 0.03% Pacific Islander, 1.1% from other races, and 1.6% from two or more races. Hispanic or Latino of any race were 2.6% of the population.

There were 2,794 households, out of which 18.1% had children under the age of 18 living with them, 41.2% were married couples living together, 5.2% had a female householder with no husband present, and 51.4% were non-families. 28.8% of all households were made up of individuals, and 19.4% had someone living alone who was 65 years of age or older. The average household size was 2.35 and the average family size was 2.84.

In the town, the population was spread out, with 30.1% under the age of 20, 30.7% from 20 to 24, 9.5% from 25 to 44, 13.2% from 45 to 64, and 16.4% who were 65 years of age or older. The median age was 21.8 years.

The median income for a household in the town was $49,542, and the median income for a family was $86,985. The per capita income for the town was $23,313. About 0% of families and 18.2% of the population were below the poverty line, including 1.2% of those under age 18 and 3.7% of those age 65 or over.

Education 
Public schools in Elon are part of the Alamance-Burlington School System, which was created by a merger between the Alamance County School System and the Burlington City School System in 1996.

Local public schools in Elon include:
 Elon Elementary
 Western Alamance Middle
 Western Alamance High

Elon University is also located in Elon, North Carolina.

Transportation 

Elon University provides a bus system known as the Biobus for use by both students of the university as well as the general public. Certain routes travel from the campus to destinations within the town of Elon as well as the surrounding area.

References

External links
 Town of Elon—official website

Towns in North Carolina
Towns in Alamance County, North Carolina